Mike Smet (born 6 March 1991) is a Belgian professional footballer who plays for Dender, as a right back.

Career
Smet made his senior debut for Germinal Beerschot in the 2007–08 season.

References

1991 births
Living people
Belgian footballers
Beerschot A.C. players
S.C. Eendracht Aalst players
Belgian Pro League players
Challenger Pro League players
K Beerschot VA players
Association football defenders
K.F.C. Dessel Sport players
F.C.V. Dender E.H. players
People from Beveren
Footballers from East Flanders